Black Pine Mountains High Point, at  above sea level is the highest peak in the Black Pine Mountains of Cassia County in southern Idaho. The high point is sometimes referred to as "Black Peak" because of a benchmark on the peak that reads "Black".

Black Pine Mountains High Point is located in the north-central part of the range northwest of Snowville, Utah and southeast of Malta in the Black Pine Division of the Minidoka Ranger District of Sawtooth National Forest.

Black Pine Mountains High Point is in the watershed of tributaries of the Snake River, which itself is a tributary of the Columbia River. View from the peak encompass the Raft River, Albion, Sublett, and Wasatch mountain ranges. The peak is a part of the Great Basin Divide and the Basin and Range Province. Interstate 84 passes to the east of the peak.

References

External links 
 Sawtooth National Forest - Official Site

Mountains of Cassia County, Idaho
Mountains of Idaho
Sawtooth National Forest